Robert Whitehead Marshall (October 29, 1923 – June 19, 1992) was a Canadian football player who played for the Toronto Argonauts and Ottawa Rough Riders. He won the Grey Cup with Toronto in 1952. He also attended and played football at McGill University. Marshall also played junior hockey briefly in Stratford, Ontario, making it to the Memorial Cup Championship. Marshall later studied law and became a businessman. In 1984 he had a leg amputated, and the following year he was inducted into the North Bay Sports Hall of Fame in February 1985. He died in 1992.

References

1923 births
1992 deaths
McGill Redbirds football players
McGill University alumni
Ottawa Rough Riders players
Players of Canadian football from Ontario
Sportspeople from Oshawa
Toronto Argonauts players